{{DISPLAYTITLE:C25H40N7O17P3S}}
The molecular formula C25H40N7O17P3S (molar mass: 835.609 g/mol) may refer to:

 Crotonyl-CoA
 Methacrylyl-CoA

Molecular formulas